Ottleya wrightii, synonym Lotus wrightii, is a species of legume native to  the southwestern United States (Arizona, Colorado, New Mexico and Utah). It is also said to occur in Nevada.  It is known as Wright's deervetch.

It has yellow flowers on many stems, arising from a single root crown.
It was named after Charles Wright.
 
The Zuni people apply a poultice of the chewed root to swellings that they believe are caused by being witched by a bullsnake.

References

Loteae
Flora of the Southwestern United States
Plants used in traditional Native American medicine
American witchcraft
Plants described in 1853